The Poisoned Kiss and Other Stories from the Portuguese is a collection of short stories written by Joyce Carol Oates. It was published in 1975 by Vanguard Press.

Background
Oates credits the stories in The Poisoned Kiss and Other Stories from the Portuguese to the imaginary author "Fernandes de Briao"; and Oates only listed herself as having translated the stories "from the Portuguese."

In the afterword to the collection Oates states that "the Fernandes stories came out of nowhere: not out of an interest in Portugal (which I have never visited), or a desire to write parables to pierce through the density of existential life that I dramatize in my own writing." She explains that these tales are the result of a remarkable phase of her life. In 1970/71, while being occupied as usual with her own writing, she "began to dream about and to sense, while awake, some other life, or vision, or personality" (p.187), and she wrote a story which was so strange to her that she felt it was not her own. As she experienced this state again and again during these years, she considers the stories she wrote then "as the expression of a part of my personality that had been stifled" (p.188), and therefore she was never able to designate herself as the author of these narratives. Oates emphasizes that "Fernandes drifted into my life at a time when I was in normal health" (p.188) and "retreated when his story seemed to be complete" (p.189); and she also admits that so far she has not been able to comprehend, to her own satisfaction, what really happened (p.189).

Stories 
The 23 short stories in the collection are as follows:
 "Maimed"

 "The Cruel Master"

 "Afterword"

"Distance"

"The Brain of Dr. Vicente"

"Two Young Men"

"The Murderer"

"Parricide"

"Plagiarized Material"

"The Poisoned Kiss"

"The Letter"

"The Seduction"

"Sunlight/Twilight"

"Impotence"

"In a Public Place"

"Journey"

"Husband and Wife"

"Letters to Fernandes from a Young American Poet"

"Loss"

"The Son of God and His Sorrow"

"The Secret Mirror"

"Our Lady of the Easy Death of Alferce"

"The Enchanted Piano"

Critical reception
In a review for the Los Angeles Times, Alan Cheuse found the collection pretentious, singling out "Plagiarized Material" as the only "truly successful" story. He concluded: "What [...] could have possessed Joyce Carol Oates to sign her name to such a disastrous collection of stories as this?" Kirkus Reviews questioned if the purpose of the collection was for "[s]elf-exploration or self-indulgence?" In the Library Journal, Bruce Allen wrote that the collection was too ambitious for its medium, with only "Loss" and "Distance" being easily recognizable as Oates' work.

In Studies in Short Fiction, Sanford Pinsker noted that a few of the stories, particularly "Plagiarized Material", were written in a "reflexive trickster" style associated with Jorge Luis Borges. Overall, Pinsker thought the collection invoked "found poetry" and established that Oates "continues to be a writer of haunting fictions extraordinaire."

References 

Short story collections by Joyce Carol Oates
1975 short story collections
Vanguard Press books